Nancy Schrom Dye (March 11, 1947 – October 28, 2015) was an American historian and philosopher and college academic who served as the first female president of Oberlin College in Oberlin, Ohio. As a professional historian, she was the author of numerous articles and several books, and she served on the editorial board of The Journal of American History.

Biography

Early life and education
Nancy Schrom Dye was born in Columbia, Missouri, in 1947. Both of her parents were college administrators. Her father served as dean of students at Miami University and Indiana University, and her mother worked as assistant to the dean of the New York University Law School.

She graduated from Vassar College, and would go on to earn a MS and PhD from University of Wisconsin–Madison.

Vassar
In 1988, she accepted a position at Vassar College, where she served as dean of the faculty as well as professor of history. She served as acting president of Vassar for several months in 1992.

President of Oberlin College
Dye became the 13th president of Oberlin College in July 1994, succeeding the embattled S. Frederick Starr. Oberlin's first female president, she oversaw the construction of new buildings, the increased selectiveness of the student body, and helped grow the endowment with the then-largest capital campaign in the college's history.

As president, Dye was known for her accessibility and inclusiveness. Especially in her first few years, she was a regular attendee at student events such as football games, concerts, and dorm parties.

On September 11, 2006, after serving as President of Oberlin College for 12 years, Dye announced her resignation effective June 30, 2007. Her resignation came after a period of transition for the college. Some were dissatisfied with Dye's communication with students and faculty, while others respected her ability to keep the college stable when other colleges were suffering financially. Her most recent biannual review was unreleased. Official reasons for the burial of the report are because of poor methodologies, although many suspect that it was due to a largely negative review.

In honor of her commitment to internationalism, the board of trustees announced the Nancy S. Dye chair for Middle Eastern and Islamic studies at Oberlin at commencement in May 2007. Dye was succeeded as Oberlin College president by Marvin Krislov in July 2007.

A 2009 article in the New York Times reported that Dye earned $1.4 million from Oberlin as its ex-president.

Death
She died at her home in Lakewood, Ohio on October 28, 2015, after battling Lewy body dementia.

Bibliography
 As Equals and As Sisters: Feminism, Trade Unionism, and the New York Women's Trade Union League (University of Missouri Press, 1980)
 (co-editor, with Noralee Frankel) Gender, Race, and Class in the Progressive Era (University Press of Kentucky, 1991)

References

Presidents of Oberlin College
Vassar College faculty
1947 births
Harvard University alumni
2015 deaths
American women historians
20th-century American historians
21st-century American historians
20th-century American women writers
21st-century American women writers
Women heads of universities and colleges
Deaths from Lewy body dementia
Deaths from dementia in Ohio